Hatch Act may refer to:

 Hatch Act of 1887, US federal legislation that created agricultural experiment stations
 Hatch Act of 1939, US federal legislation prohibiting some political activities for employees in the executive branch

See also
 Pendleton Civil Service Reform Act (1883), established that positions within the federal government should be awarded on the basis of merit